Canon or abbot Antoine Sabarthès, full name Antoine Auguste Sabarthès, (27 May 1854 – 19 February 1944) was a French ecclesiastic, writer and historian, a specialist of the Aude department.

Biography 
A poorly publicized figure, not much is known about the life of Abbé Sabarthès, who lived until his 90th birthday. Only his works will be taken from him.

He entered the seminary in Carcassonne, where he studied and was ordained in 1878. He became a priest of the diocese of Carcassonne. After several assignments in villages, he devoted himself to the study of society, the church and the territories administered by it; He published several works in Latin, Occitan and French.

Historian 
Nowadays, Sabarthès is synonymous with reference for all that concerns the Aude department. He was a member of numerous , an adherent and publicist for many years to the "", the "Comité des travaux historiques et scientifiques", the "Société des Arts et Sciences de Carcassonne" and the "Commission archéologique et littéraire de Narbonne".

He began by publishing numerous essays on his work in the drafting stage, limited to specific subjects, but his major work is undoubtedly the Dictionnaire topographique du département de l'Aude published in 1912, providing details on all the cantons and villages of the department, from archival works now missing, making the correspondences between the ancient and modern names of the places.

Main publications 

 1891: La Statue de Notre-Dame de Fontfroide
 1893: Étude historique sur l'Abbaye de Saint-Paul de Narbonne
 1895: Le dernier Livre vert de l'archevêque de Narbonne
 1895: Ordre de Saint-Jean de Jérusalem ou de Malte, la Commanderie de Narbonne
 1896: La Leude de Montréal
 1897: Les Coutumes, libertés et franchises de Montréal
 1901: Une date et un nom à rectifier dans la liste chronologique des abbés de Saint-Paul de Narbonne
 1902: Inventaire des droits et revenus de l'évêché de Saint-Papoul
 1902: Charte communale de Fendeille
 1903: Le Concile d'Attilian
 1904: Donation de Floranus et d'Anseria à l'Abbaye de Lagrasse
 1904: Les Libertés et coutumes de Pexiora
 1904: Étude sur les noms de baptême à Leucate
 1905: Les Évêchés de la Narbonnaise en 678
 1907: Les Abbayes de St-Laurent dans le Narbonnais
 1907: Essai sur la toponymie de l'Aude, qui réunit : «Étude sur la toponomastique de l'Aude» et «Essai sur les cours d'eau du département de l'Aude»
 1912: Dictionnaire topographique du département de l'Aude
 1914: Bibliographie de l'Aude
 1920: Cabrespine (Aude), Cabrières (Hérault)
 1920: Les seigneurs de Palaja au XIIIe et au XIVe siècle
 1924: Trois chartes de la commune de Limoux
 1924: Le Couvent des Clarisses de Carcassonne
 1930: Les manuscrits consulaires de Limoux, Aude
 1939: Histoire du clergé de l'Aude de 1789 à 1803
 1941: Les Saintes reliques conservées dans l'église Saint-Martin de Limoux

Trivia 
The Académie des inscriptions et belles-lettres awarded him the first medal of the competition Antiquités nationales de la France, for his work on les manuscrits consulaires de Limoux published in 1930.

References

External links 
 Dictionnaire Topographique du Département de l'Aude - Abbé Sabarthès
 L'abbé Antoine Sabarthès

French historians of religion
19th-century French historians
20th-century French historians
1854 births
1944 deaths
French Roman Catholic priests